Phosphoenolpyruvate (2-phosphoenolpyruvate, PEP) is the ester derived from the enol of pyruvate and phosphate.  It exists as an anion. PEP is an important intermediate in biochemistry. It has the highest-energy phosphate bond found (−61.9 kJ/mol) in organisms, and is involved in glycolysis and gluconeogenesis.  In plants, it is also involved in the biosynthesis of various aromatic compounds, and in carbon fixation; in bacteria, it is also used as the source of energy for the phosphotransferase system.

In glycolysis
PEP is formed by the action of the enzyme enolase on 2-phosphoglyceric acid.  Metabolism of PEP to pyruvic acid by pyruvate kinase (PK) generates adenosine triphosphate (ATP) via substrate-level phosphorylation.  ATP is one of the major currencies of chemical energy within cells.

In gluconeogenesis
PEP is formed from the decarboxylation of oxaloacetate and hydrolysis of one guanosine triphosphate molecule.  This reaction is catalyzed by the enzyme phosphoenolpyruvate carboxykinase (PEPCK).  This reaction is a rate-limiting step in gluconeogenesis:

GTP + oxaloacetate → GDP + phosphoenolpyruvate + CO2

Interactive pathway map

In plants 
PEP may be used for the synthesis of chorismate through the shikimate pathway.  Chorismate may then be metabolized into the aromatic amino acids (phenylalanine, tryptophan and tyrosine) and other aromatic compounds. The first step is when Phosphoenolpyruvate and erythrose-4-phosphate react to form 3-deoxy-D-arabinoheptulosonate-7-phosphate (DAHP), in a reaction catalyzed by the enzyme DAHP synthase. 

In addition, in C4 plants, PEP serves as an important substrate in carbon fixation.  The chemical equation, as catalyzed by phosphoenolpyruvate carboxylase (PEP carboxylase), is:

PEP +  → oxaloacetate

References

Enoic acids
Glycolysis
Organophosphates